Temirgoevsky District is an administrative-territorial unit within the territory of Azov-Black Sea and Krasnodar, which existed in 1934–1953. Center of district was Temirgoevsky village.

History 
Temirgoevsky District was established on December 28, 1934, as part of the Azov-Black Sea Territory. Later, Temirgoevsky district became part of the Krasnodar Territory on September 13, 1937, and was abolished on August 22, 1953.

References 

Districts of Krasnodar Krai
States and territories established in 1934
States and territories disestablished in 1953
1953 disestablishments in the Soviet Union
1934 establishments in Russia